Hermann-Josef Blanke (26 August 1957 – 9 January 2023) was a German academic and legal scholar.

Biography
Blanke was born on 26 August 1957. He studied law and romance studies at the University of Bonn, the Complutense University of Madrid, and the University of Florence. He received his Doctor of Law from Osnabrück University. He worked as a Wissenschaftlicher Assistent at the University of Cologne from 1990 to 1991. He was then a lecturer at the University of Trier, Heinrich Heine University Düsseldorf, the University of Bonn, and the University of Cologne.

From 2000 to 2023, Blanke was a professor of law and political science at the University of Erfurt, specializing in public law, international law, and European integration. During this time, he also held guest professorships in Argentina, Brazil, and Italy.

Blanke was awarded the Grand-Cross of the Order of Saint Raymond of Peñafort in 2018. In 2021, he was awarded a Jean Monnet Chair by the European Commission.

At the time of his death, the Court had not yet made a decision.

Blanke died unexpectedly on 9 January 2023, at the age of 65.

References

1957 births
2023 deaths
German academics
German legal scholars
German jurists
University of Bonn alumni
Complutense University of Madrid alumni
University of Florence alumni
Osnabrück University alumni
Academic staff of the University of Erfurt
People from Hamm